Faelán mac Muiredach (Fáeláin) (died 942) was a King of Leinster in Ireland, from 917 until his death in 942. He was a member of the Uí Dúnchada, a sept of the Uí Dúnlainge dynasty.
Faelan mac Muiredach, was the son of Muiredach mac Brain, who was king of Leinster 884-885. Muiredach was the son of Bran mac Fáeláin, who had been king 834 to 838. They had a family history of Kings of Leinster going back to 495.

References

10th-century kings of Leinster
940 deaths